Mélissa Ferreira Gomes (born 27 April 1994) is a Portuguese professional footballer who plays as a forward for French Division 1 Féminine club Bordeaux and the Portugal national team.

Club career
A youth academy graduate of Juvisy, Gomes made her club career debut on 6 November 2013 in a 3–1 win against Rodez. She replaced Sandrine Brétigny at 79th minute of the game and went on to score a goal ten minutes later.

On 2 July 2021, Gomes joined Bordeaux on a two-year deal.

International career
Born in France, Gomes represents Portugal in international football. She was part of Portuguese squad which reached semi-finals of 2012 UEFA Women's Under-19 Championship. She made her senior team debut on 26 September 2013 in a 5–1 win against Greece.

Gomes have represented Portugal at 2016 Women's Euro Beach Soccer Cup and helped her team to finish third.

Career statistics

International

References

External links
 UEFA player profile
 
 Mélissa Gomes at footofeminin.fr 

1994 births
Living people
Women's association football forwards
Portuguese women's footballers
Portugal women's international footballers
French women's footballers
French people of Portuguese descent
Division 1 Féminine players
Division 2 Féminine players
Paris FC (women) players
Stade de Reims Féminines players
FC Girondins de Bordeaux (women) players
Footballers from Val-de-Marne